Michael Ring (born 24 December 1953) is an Irish Fine Gael politician who has been a Teachta Dála (TD) for the Mayo constituency since 1997, and previously from 1994 to 1997 for the Mayo West constituency. He served as Minister for Rural and Community Development from 2017 to 2020 and as a Minister of State from 2011 to 2017.

Early and personal life 
Ring was born in Westport, County Mayo, in 1953. He was educated at Westport CBS and the local vocational school. He later worked as an estate agent and auctioneer in Westport.

Political career 
Ring was unsuccessful as a Fine Gael candidate in the Mayo West constituency in the 1992 general election. However, he was elected at his second attempt in a 1994 by-election.

He was appointed to the Fine Gael Front Bench in 2002, as Spokesperson on Social and Family Affairs. Ring stepped down from the Front Bench in 2004, after an expected demotion, however, he returned in 2007 as Spokesperson on Community, Rural and Gaeltacht Affairs.

On 10 March 2011, he was appointed as Minister of State at the Department of Transport, Tourism and Sport with responsibility for Tourism and Sport by the coalition government of Fine Gael and the Labour Party led by Ring's constituency colleague Enda Kenny. This appointment lasted until the formation of a new government on 6 May.

On 19 May 2016, he was appointed as Minister of State at the Department of Arts, Heritage, Regional, Rural and Gaeltacht Affairs with responsibility for Regional Economic Development by the new minority government of Fine Gael and Independents led by Enda Kenny.

He was appointed to cabinet on 14 June 2017 as Minister for Rural and Community Development in the new minority government of Fine Gael and Independents led by Leo Varadkar. His appointment ended on 27 June 2020 on the formation of the new government.

References

External links 
Michael Ring's page on the Fine Gael website

 

1953 births
Living people
Alumni of the University of Galway
Fine Gael TDs
Irish auctioneers
Local councillors in County Mayo
Members of the 27th Dáil
Members of the 28th Dáil
Members of the 29th Dáil
Members of the 30th Dáil
Members of the 31st Dáil
Members of the 32nd Dáil
Ministers of State of the 31st Dáil
Ministers of State of the 32nd Dáil
People from Westport, County Mayo
Members of the 33rd Dáil